Hugh Hastings (31 January 191726 November 2004) was an Australian writer best known for his play Seagulls Over Sorrento. He moved to England in 1936 determined to break into theatre as an actor or writer. He served in the British Royal Navy for over five years during World War II.

Life
Hastings's Seagulls Over Sorrento made theatre history by running for 1,551 performances at London's Apollo Theatre. Only two other plays had then run longer in theatre history:  Noël Coward's Blithe Spirit; and R. F. Delderfield's Worm's Eye View.

Part of the play's appeal was that it was radical for the time. The play was set inside a Royal Navy research station near Scapa Flow. The play was not popular with everyone, and not everyone saw the humor in it. It elicited subdued laughs as well as frowns, depending on whether the audience was liberal or conservative.

He estimated he made £50,000 from Sorrento. The fortune grew to £100,000 when in 1954 a film version made by the Boulting brothers was released.

Hastings has an uncredited movie role in the 1952 film The Gift Horse, on which he worked on the script. Hastings also wrote the dialogues for a Marghanita Laski melodrama, It Started In Paradise (1952). He also wrote another naval play, Red Dragon. It was based on the 1949 Yangtze Incident, which involved . The play failed to make an impression. None of his other works reached the success levels of Sorrento. Even different versions of his most famous work failed to succeed. The television version of Sorrento was broadcast in 1960 with no real impact. He also financed and wrote a musical version, entitled Scapa, which ran for a few weeks at the Adelphi Theatre in 1962.

Select credits
The Quadrille (1936) – play
Seagulls Over Sorrento (1950) – play
Red Dragon (1950) – based on the Amethyst Incident
Inner Circle (1952) – play
Glory at Sea (1952) – screenplay
A Touch of the Sun (1952) – play
Pink Elephants (1955) – play
Blood Orange (1958) – play
Scapa! (1962) – book for musical
The Green Carnation (1973)

References

External links

Obituary at The Guardian
Obituary at The Stage
Hugh Hastings at AustLit

Australian writers
1917 births
2004 deaths
Royal Navy personnel of World War II
Australian emigrants to the United Kingdom